The 1909 Wabash Little Giants football team represented Wabash College during the 1909 college football season.  Under legendary coach and future College Football Hall of Fame inductee Jesse Harper, the Little Giants compiled a 3–4–1 record, and played a tough schedule that included Michigan State (then known as Michigan Agricultural), Purdue, and Notre Dame.

Schedule

References

Wabash
Wabash Little Giants football seasons
Wabash Little Giants football